Saline City may refer to:

 Saline City, former name of Drawbridge, California
 Saline City, Missouri
 Saline City, Indiana